Christopher "Christy" Ryan (25 December 1899 – 22 February 1978) was an Irish hurler who played as a right wing-back for the Limerick senior team.

Keane made his first appearance for the team in a tournament game in late 1918 and was a regular member of the starting fifteen until his retirement after the 1930 championship. During that time he won one All-Ireland medal and one Munster medal.

At club level Ryan enjoyed a lengthy career with Pallasgreen.

Ryan hailed from a family with a close association with Gaelic games. His uncles, Tom, John and James Barry won All-Ireland medals with London in 1901. His brother, Dick Ryan, won an All-Ireland medal with Limerick in 1918.

References

1899 births
1978 deaths
Pallasgreen hurlers
Limerick inter-county hurlers
All-Ireland Senior Hurling Championship winners